Maynard Ansley Holliday is the Director of Defense Research and Engineering for Modernization at The Pentagon. He previously worked under Barack Obama, during which time he launched the Defense Innovation Unit. Holliday was Project Manager for Pioneer, a robot which helped to map the inside for the Chernobyl Nuclear Power Plant.

Early life and education 
Holliday was born in Providence, Rhode Island. He watched Star Trek as a child, and wanted to become an astronaut. He grew up in Scarsdale, New York. Holliday studied mechanical engineering at Carnegie Mellon University, where he was one of only fifteen African American engineers in his class. During his studies he became interested in robotics, as the nuclear meltdown at Three Mile Island resulted in the launch of a Carnegie Mellon spin off company called RedZone Robotics, with Red Whittaker as the Chief Scientist. Holliday worked with Red Whittaker who was designing robotic systems to explore the contaminated reactor. He was selected to attend the International Space University in 1991 and reached the finals of the United States astronaut corps in 1994 and 1996. Holliday withdrew his application to NASA after the Space Shuttle Columbia disaster.

Research and career 
Holliday joined Lawrence Livermore National Laboratory as a robotics engineer. He realised that the advanced assignments were given to people with advanced degrees, so took a career break. He was awarded a scholarship to work on robotics and international security at Stanford University, and started their graduate program in mechanical engineering design. Holliday worked on the target positioning systems of the National Ignition Facility. In 1995 Holliday was awarded an American Association for the Advancement of Science Science Engineering and Diplomacy Fellowship, and moved to Washington, D.C. to work on science and technology policy at United States Agency for International Development. During his fellowship he pitched that the international funding for the Chernobyl disaster should include support for the development of robotics. After his fellowship he worked for the United States Department of Energy in the Russia Nuclear Materials Taskforce, in which he and help implement nuclear material security upgrades at Russian nuclear cities. He worked with the Institute of Special Mechanical Programs in Ukraine on the Pioneer robot design, which, during the Cold War, designed guidance and control systems for Soviet ballistic missiles. Holliday's efforts on securing tons of weapons grade nuclear material were recognised with the Meritorious Service Medal, the DOE's highest civilian award.

Holliday served as Project Manager for the Pioneer robot, which helped the Ukrainians map the inside of the Chernobyl Nuclear Power Plant. He collaborated with Whittaker's RedZone Robotics and delivered the finished product in 1999. The robot, which cost $3 million, was designed to withstand considerably more radiation than humans could tolerate and stay inside the nuclear reactor for up to two years. It used the Jet Propulsion Laboratory Vision System to identify and document properties of materials inside the Chernobyl Nuclear Power Plant, a system which became a prototype for the Mars Pathfinder. During the development of Pioneer, Holliday travelled to the Chernobyl Exclusion Zone four times.

After leaving the United States Department of Energy, Holliday returned to Silicon Valley, where he helped develop pattern recognition for Evolution Robotics. He contributed to the design and development of High Definition (HD) camera systems for Intuitive Surgical's da Vinci telerobotic surgery robot. Holliday joined Sandia National Laboratories in 2011, where he worked in the Systems Analysis Group.

During Barack Obama's second term in office, Holliday was appointed as Senior Technical Advisor to Frank Kendall the longest serving Undersecretary of Defense for Acquisition, Technology and Logistics (AT&L) in the history of the Pentagon. He worked inside The Pentagon and helped to establish the Defense Innovation Unit Experimental (DIUx). DIU contracts with non traditional Silicon Valley companies to solve Pentagon problems in areas where the commercial sector is moving faster than the government. This includes projects in areas like autonomy, artificial intelligence, space and cyber. It was established to provide pilot contacts for commercial innovation that helped United States Department of Defense problems quickly, and helped provide access to test environments. The DIUx had fast contract-to-prototyping processes. He served as an advisor for the Defense Science Board in 2015. Holliday was awarded the Defense Medal for Exceptional Public Service. Holliday left The Pentagon in January 2017. He joined RAND Corporation in February 2017, where he led autonomous vehicle research.

Holliday returned to The Pentagon in 2021, where he was appointed Director of Defense Research and Engineering for Modernization. In this capacity he oversees investment in the National Defense Strategy, identifying modernisation priorities such as 5G, hypersonics and quantum science.

Outreach and engagement 
Holliday works on various projects that teach young people about science and engineering. His motto is the popular, "you learn it, earn it, and return it". Holliday was involved with Barack Obama's My Brother's Keeper program, a scheme which supported young people in accessing science and engineering initiatives. He co-founded Robot Garden, a community makerspace in Livermore, and remains on their Board of Advisors. In 2012 he was named the Citizen Schools Volunteer of the Year for his efforts at Elmhurst Community Prep school. He has also taught advanced robotics classes at San Ramon Valley High School. Holliday is particularly committed to public engagement to improve diversity within science and engineering. Whilst discussing his career in an interview with Carnegie Mellon University he stated "...these organisations... are doing things that affect the entire population, and it’s important that there are diverse voices at the table to be able to promote those viewpoints".

References 

Living people
Carnegie Mellon University alumni
Carnegie Mellon University College of Engineering alumni
Stanford University alumni
African-American engineers
People from Scarsdale, New York
Year of birth missing (living people)
Lawrence Livermore National Laboratory staff